Alexander Arbuthnot (died 1 September 1585) was an early printer in Edinburgh, Scotland, the fourth son of John Arbuthnot Sr in Portertown and of Legasland.

Life
He printed the first edition of George Buchanan's first History of Scotland in 1582. He married one Agnes Pennycuick and died intestate.

Footnotes

References

External links
 

Scottish printers
Businesspeople from Edinburgh
Arbuthnot family
1585 deaths
Year of birth unknown